]
Sheila Z. Siwela was appointed as Zambia’s ambassador to the United States on June 25, 2010 and from 2005 to 2008, she was Zambia’s Ambassador to Zimbabwe.

Education

Siwela has a diploma in Social Work from the University of Zambia, a bachelor’s degree in Administration from the University of Western Ontario in Canada, and a master’s degree in Human Resources Development from the University of Manchester in the United Kingdom.

References

Women ambassadors
Ambassadors of Zambia to the United States
Living people
University of Zambia alumni
University of Western Ontario alumni
Alumni of the University of Manchester
Year of birth missing (living people)